Parallel World is the fifth studio album by Cadence Weapon, nee Roland Pemberton, released April 30, 2021. The album was the winner of the 2021 Polaris Music Prize.

The album is marked by political themes about Black Canadian life and experience. Pemberton described the concept as being told with a "journalistic lens" that was largely inspired by watching the George Floyd protests in 2020.

Track listing

References

2021 albums
Cadence Weapon albums
Polaris Music Prize-winning albums